The 1975 Speedway World Team Cup was the 16th edition of the FIM Speedway World Team Cup to determine the team world champions.

The final took place at Motodrom Halbemond in Norden, Lower Saxony, West Germany. The title was won by England for the fifth consecutive year and sixth time in total. The sixth win took brought them level with Sweden for the record of most wins.

Qualification

British Round
 July 14
  Reading, Reading Stadium

* England to Final

Scandinavian Round
 June 8
  Målilla, Målilla Speedway
 Att: 2,200

* Sweden to Final

Continental Qualifying Round
 June 8
  Civitanova Marche

* West Germany and Austria to Continental Semifinal

Continental Qualifying Round
 June 8
  Debrecen

* Czechoslovakia and Hungary to Continental Semifinal

Tournament

Continental Semifinal
 June 29
  Bremen

* Czechoslovakia and West Germany to Continental Final

Continental Final
 July 12
  Slaný

* Soviet Union and Poland to Final

World Final
 September 21
  Norden, Motodrom Halbemond
 Att: 20,000
 Referee:  Georg Traunspurger

See also
 1975 Individual Speedway World Championship
 1975 Speedway World Pairs Championship

References

1975
World T